Castres – Mazamet Airport  is an airport serving Castres and Mazamet and the east of Midi-Pyrénées.

Facilities
It has one paved runway designated 14/32 which measures . The airport is VFR and IFR compliant.

Airlines and destinations 
The following airlines operate regular scheduled and charter flights at Castres–Mazamet Airport:

Statistics

References

External links
 

Airports in Occitania (administrative region)
Buildings and structures in Tarn (department)
Airports established in 1990
1990 establishments in France